The International Cooperation Administration (ICA) was a United States government agency operating from June 30, 1955 until September 4, 1961, responsible for foreign assistance and 'nonmilitary security' programs. It was the predecessor of the present-day U.S. Agency for International Development.

History

The International Cooperation Administration (ICA) was established by the U.S. State Department Delegation of Authority 85, from June 30, 1955, pursuant to EO 10610, May 9, 1955. Its predecessor was the Foreign Operations Administration (FOA) founded in 1953. Both organizations coordinated foreign assistance operations and conducted all nonmilitary security programs for the United States. On September 4, 1961 the ICA was abolished by act of Congress (75 Stat. 446) and all functions were transferred to U.S. Agency for International Development.

The ICA consisted of several departments or agencies organized by region. They included the Institute of Inter-American Affairs.

Historical records 

Historical records from the 'Office of Participant Training', including those pertaining to the organization of third-country training in Europe (1951–61) still exist, as do US Mission to NATO and European Regional Organizations (USRO) reports of third-country training in Europe (1956–60).

Examples of surviving film reports include "Report to the American People on Technical Cooperation" (1955), showing U.S. assistance to Afghanistan, Ecuador, Ethiopia, India, Indochina, Indonesia, Libya, Paraguay, Sudan, and Thailand, and "Strength for Peace" (1955), describing U.S. military assistance programs and cooperation with the North Atlantic Treaty Organization, Southeast Treaty Organization and Rio Pact countries.

References

External links

Documents authored or sponsored by ICA,  USAID Development Experience Clearinghouse (USAID/DEC)
Documents authored or sponsored by the Institute of Inter-American Affairs available from the USAID Development Experience Clearinghouse (USAID/DEC)

1955 establishments in Washington, D.C.
1961 disestablishments in Washington, D.C.
Government agencies established in 1955
Government agencies disestablished in 1961
International development agencies
Civil affairs of the United States military
Foreign relations of the United States